Samuel R. McClellan was a member of the Wisconsin State Senate.

Biography
McClellan was born on March 19, 1806, in Colrain, Massachusetts. He died on June 11, 1890.

Senate career
McClellan represented the 8th District of the Senate during the 1858 and 1859 sessions. He was a Republican.

References

External links

Wisconsin Historical Society

People from Colrain, Massachusetts
Republican Party Wisconsin state senators
1806 births
1890 deaths
Burials in Wisconsin
19th-century American politicians